Flaunt It may refer to:

Flaunt It (album), a 1986 album by Sigue Sigue Sputnik
"Flaunt It" (song), a 2006 song by TV Rock